Senator Newhouse may refer to:

Joe Newhouse (born 1977), Oklahoma State Senate
Richard H. Newhouse Jr. (1924–2002), Illinois State Senate